The men's triathlon was part of the Triathlon at the 2018 Asian Games program, was held in JSC Lake Jakabaring on 1 September 2018. The race was held over the "international distance" and consisted of  swimming,  road bicycle racing, and  road running.

Jumpei Furuya of Japan won the gold medal after finished in a time of 1 hour 49 minutes 43 seconds. The silver and bronze medals were earned by Ayan Beisenbayev from Kazakhstan and Li Mingxu from China respectively.

Schedule
All times are Western Indonesia Time (UTC+07:00)

Results 
Legend
DNF — Did not finish
DSQ — Disqualified

References

External links 
 Results

Triathlon at the 2018 Asian Games